A first-look deal is any contract containing a clause granting, usually for a fee or other consideration that covers a specified period of time, a pre-emption right, right of first refusal, or right of first offer (also called a right of first negotiation) to another party, who then is given the first opportunity to buy outright, co-own, invest in, license, etc., something that is newly coming into existence or on the market for the first time or after an absence, such as intellectual property (manuscript, musical composition, invention, artwork, business idea, etc.) or real property (real estate).

Film industry
In the film industry, it is an agreement between a writer and an independent production company or between an independent production company and a film studio in which the potential buyer (producer or studio) of a not-yet-written script or in-development film or television project pays a development fee to the writer or producer for the right to have the first look at the new material before others in the industry get to see it, and at that time make an offer to purchase or distribute or adhere to purchasing or distribution terms already stated in the agreement.

See also

Tag-along right
Drag-along right
Overall deal

References 

Film production
Intellectual property law